Immanuel Lutheran Church is a historic church at 1215 Thomas Street in Seattle, Washington.

It was built in 1907 and added to the National Register in 1982.

References

Lutheran churches in Washington (state)
Churches on the National Register of Historic Places in Washington (state)
Churches completed in 1907
Churches in Seattle
South Lake Union, Seattle
National Register of Historic Places in Seattle